Virginia's 46th House of Delegates district elects one of 100 seats in the Virginia House of Delegates, the lower house of the state's bicameral legislature. District 46 is composed of part of Alexandria, Virginia. It is represented by Democrat Charniele Herring.

In the 2015 Virginia elections Herring defeated Republican Sean Lenehan and Libertarian Andy Bakker.  Herring ran unopposed in 2017.

Results

References

External links
 

Virginia House of Delegates districts
Alexandria, Virginia